Dennis Raymond Gilchrist (1909 – July 25, 1936) was an American baseball shortstop and second baseman in the Negro leagues. 

A native of High Point, North Carolina, Gilchrist played with several teams from 1932 to 1935. He died in Columbus, Ohio in 1936 at age 26 or 27.

References

External links
 and Baseball-Reference Black Baseball stats and Seamheads

Brooklyn Eagles players
Cleveland Red Sox players
Columbus Blue Birds players
Homestead Grays players
Indianapolis ABCs (1931–1933) players
New York Black Yankees players
1909 births
1936 deaths
Baseball players from North Carolina
Baseball shortstops
Baseball second basemen
Sportspeople from High Point, North Carolina